Branca Eva de Gonta Syder Ribeiro Colaço (July 8, 1880 — March 22, 1945), better known as Branca de Gonta Colaço, was a Portuguese writer, scholar and linguist. She was the daughter of British Charlotte Ann Syder and Portuguese politician and writer Tomás Ribeiro and mother of the sculptor, Ana de Gonta Colaço.

Biography 

Displaying an early talent for revealing the letters, Branca de Gonta Colaço started out as a poet and as a collaborator in literary journals, actively contributing to a large number of newspapers and magazines. She collaborated with many newspapers, especially The Day by José Augusto Moreira de Almeida and The Thalassa  (1913–1915) the humorous newspapers which were run by her husband. She also contributed to Fireside  (1901–1911), Illustração portugueza (1903–1980) and Illustration  (1926–1975).

References

External links 
 https://web.archive.org/web/20160303212609/http://www.marinha.pt/extra/revista/ra_mar2002/pag8.html (in Portuguese)
 http://urn.porbase.org/bibliografia/unimarc/txt?id=49354 (in Portuguese)

1880 births
1945 deaths
19th-century Portuguese women writers
20th-century linguists
20th-century Portuguese poets
20th-century Portuguese women writers
Linguists from Portugal
Portuguese people of British descent
Portuguese women poets